Kentucky Route 463 (KY 463) is a  state highway in the U.S. state of Kentucky. The highway connects mostly rural areas of Letcher and Perry counties with Gordon and Delphia.

Route description

Letcher County
KY 463 begins at an intersection with KY 160 in Gordon, within the southwestern part of Letcher County. It travels to the northwest, paralleling Line Fork, and leaves the fork. The highway intersects the eastern terminus of KY 510 and begins paralleling Trace Branch. It curves to the north-northwest. It curves to the northwest and crosses over the branch. It then gradually curves back to the north-northwest and then to the west-southwest. Then, the highway enters Perry County.

Perry County
KY 463 curves to the north-northwest and then begins paralleling Blair Fork. It travels through Delphia. It begins paralleling Leatherwood Creek and then crosses over the creek and Stony Fork. It curves to the north-northeast and crosses over Lynn Fork. It then travels under a railroad bridge and crosses over Leatherwood Creek before meeting its northern terminus, an intersection with KY 699 (Bridge Road).

Major intersections

See also

References

0463
Transportation in Letcher County, Kentucky
Transportation in Perry County, Kentucky